Heart of Paris (French: Coeur de Paris) is a 1932 French film directed by Jean Benoît-Lévy and  Marie Epstein and starring Simone Mareuil, Blanche Beaume and Jimmy Gaillard.

Cast
 Simone Mareuil as Jeannette Durand  
 Blanche Beaume as Madame Durand  
 Jimmy Gaillard as Le jeune Tutur 
 Léon Roger-Maxime as Gustave  
 Pierre Finaly as Monsieur Wood-Trafinsky 
 Paul Velsa 
 Albert Broquin

References

Bibliography 
 Crisp, Colin. Genre, Myth and Convention in the French Cinema, 1929-1939. Indiana University Press, 2002.

External links 
 

1932 films
1930s French-language films
Films directed by Jean Benoît-Lévy
French black-and-white films
1930s French films